Tomb of Tự Đức, officially Khiêm Mausoleum, is located in Huế, Vietnam. It is built for the Nguyễn Emperor Tự Đức and took three years to build from 1864–1867. It is divided into a Temple Area and a Tomb Area.

History 
Emperor Tu Duc enjoyed the longest reign of any monarch of the Nguyen dynasty, ruling from 1848-1883. Although he had 104 wives and concubines, he was unable to father a son (possibly he became sterile after contracting smallpox). Thus, it fell to him to write his own epitaph on the deeds of his reign. He felt this was a bad omen, but the epitaph can still be found inscribed on the stele in the pavilion just to the east of the Emperor's tomb. This stele is the largest of its type in Vietnam, and had to be brought here from a quarry over 500 kilometers away--a trip that took four years. 

Tu Duc began planning his tomb long before his death in 1883. The major portions of the tomb complex were completed from 1864-1867, along with future temple buildings that served as a palatial retreat for Tu Duc and his many wives during his lifetime. Construction of the tomb demanded so much corvee labor and extra taxation that there was an abortive coup against Tu Duc in 1866. This was put down, and for the remainder of his life, Tu Duc continued to use the tomb's palace buildings as his place of residence. 

Amenities for the living are unmatched at any other tomb in Vietnam. Here, the Emperor could boat on the lake and hunt small game on the tiny island in the lake's middle. He could recline at Xung Khiem Pavilion (冲嗛榭) and recite or compose poetry in the company of his concubines. After trips on the lake, the boats would moor at Du Khiem Pavilion (吁嗛榭), from which the Emperor and his entourage could walk directly west into the palace area of the tomb. 

After the Emperor's death in 1883 his adopted son Kien Phuc took over as the Nguyen Emperor. Perhaps because he only ruled seven months before dying, a separate tomb was not established for him. Instead, he was laid to rest in a small corner on the grounds of Tu Duc's tomb. Between the tombs of Tu Duc and his son is the tomb of Empress Le Thien Anh, Tu Duc's primary wife. 

Despite the grandeur of the site and the amount of time Tu Duc spent here, he was buried in a different, secret location somewhere in Hue. To keep the secret safe the 200 laborers who buried the king were all beheaded after they returned from the secret route. To this day, the real tomb of Tu Duc remains hidden.

External links 

entrance fee 2023 - 150.000vnd/pax

 

Khai Dinh
Buildings and structures in Huế
Buildings and structures completed in 1867